Sapwaturrahman (born 13 May 1994) is an Indonesian track and field athlete. He competed in the 100 metres event at the 2013 World Championships in Athletics.  He was the 2019 Southeast Asian Games and 2016 ASEAN University Games champion in the long jump.

References

External links
 

1994 births
Living people
Indonesian male sprinters
Indonesian long jumpers
Place of birth missing (living people)
World Athletics Championships athletes for Indonesia
Athletes (track and field) at the 2018 Asian Games
Medalists at the 2018 Asian Games
Asian Games bronze medalists for Indonesia
Asian Games medalists in athletics (track and field)
Competitors at the 2019 Southeast Asian Games
Southeast Asian Games gold medalists for Indonesia
Southeast Asian Games bronze medalists for Indonesia
Competitors at the 2021 Southeast Asian Games
21st-century Indonesian people
20th-century Indonesian people